Kuncoro  (born 7 March 1973) is a former Indonesian football player. He was a defender and midfielder. He played for Indonesia in the 1994 Independence Cup, the Tiger PSSI and the 1998 Tiger Cup. He won titles in three different seasons: with Arema in 1992−93, PSM Makassar in 1999–2000, and Persik Kediri in 2003.

In April 2000, he was involved in an incident with Kurniawan Dwi Yulianto and Mursyid Effendi at a Crystal Meth party at the Weta Hotel, Surabaya. He was disciplined by the PSSI Komdis. After retiring, he attended a C license trainer course. Currently he is assistant coach for Arema.

Honours

Club
Arema Malang
 Galatama: 1992−93

PSM Makassar
 Liga Indonesia Premier Division: 1999–2000

Persik Kediri
 Liga Indonesia Premier Division: 2003

International
Indonesia
 AFF Championship third place: 1998

References

Indonesian footballers
1973 births
Living people
People from Blitar
Sportspeople from East Java
Liga 1 (Indonesia) players
Arema F.C. players
Persija Jakarta players
PSM Makassar players
Persebaya Surabaya players
Indonesian expatriate footballers
Indonesia international footballers
Association football central defenders